Andrzej Piekoszewski (born 30 June 1950) is a Polish luger. He competed in the men's singles event at the 1976 Winter Olympics.

References

1950 births
Living people
Polish male lugers
Olympic lugers of Poland
Lugers at the 1976 Winter Olympics
Sportspeople from Szczecin